Don't Doubt Your Wife is a 1922 American silent drama directed by James W. Horne based on the story by Leah Baird and starring Leah Baird and Emory Johnson. The movie was released on March 12, 1922 by Associated Exhibitors.



Plot

Rose Manning, played by Leah Baird, is traveling home when a storm breaks out. She needs to take shelter and dry-off. She sees a nearby roadhouse and pulls-in. As luck would have it, taking refuge in the same lodge is an old boyfriend - Herbert Olden played by Emory Johnson.

Suddenly like the storm, prohibition agents show up to raid the lodge. Panic ensues. Even though Rose was drying her clothes and only partially clad, she still manages to bail out a back window. Herbert likewise follows her outside using the same window. Herbert senses she's embarrassed and cold, so he offers his coat.

Rose makes it home. She walks in the front door after midnight wearing Herbert Olden’s coat. Rose's husband suspects she is having an affair. Her husband, John Manning, played by Edward Peil Sr, immediately orders her to pack up and leave. Rose pleads her case, but John will hear none of it. John states he will file for divorce in the morning

Herbert Olden’s mother remembers Rose. The Rose she knows couldn’t have a secret affair with her son, despite what her husband thinks. She talks Rose into making one final appeal to her husband to take her back. Once again, her husband will not accept her explanation. He still intends to file for divorce.

Herbert Olden feels sorry for his old flame. He tries to make things better by offering to marry Rose once she gets her divorce. Rose is emotionally distraught, decides to accept his marriage proposal. The wedding plans solidify and the wedding scheduled. On the day of the wedding, Rose finds out she is pregnant.  She is carrying her ex-husband’s child. Herbert discovers Rose is expecting. He also finds out the baby is John Mannings. Herbert decides now is the time for a reconciliation between Rose and John.

John is having second thoughts about his divorce. Then Herbert appears and informs John of Rose’s condition. John believes he made a big mistake when he parted ways with Rose. John drives to the church where the wedding is about to take place. He begs Rose for forgiveness. Rose forgives him. John takes Herbert’s position on the altar. The reunited couple is married.

Cast
{| 
! style="width: 180px; text-align: left;" |  Actor
! style="width: 230px; text-align: left;" |  Role
|- style="text-align: left;"
|Leah Baird||Rose Manning
|-
|Edward Peil Sr||John Manning
|-
|Emory Johnson||Herbert Olden
|-
|Mathilde Brundage||Mrs. Evanston
|-
|Katherine Lewis||Marie Braban
|-
|}

Production
Actress Leah Baird wrote the original story and screenplay for this production.  She also starred and produced the photoplay.

Picture gallery

Preservation status
There are no known copies of this film that have survived.

References

External links

American silent feature films
American black-and-white films
Films directed by James W. Horne
Associated Exhibitors films
1920s English-language films
1920s American films